Ernest Oliver Kirkendall (July 6, 1914 – August 22, 2005) was an American chemist and metallurgist. He is known for his 1947 discovery of the Kirkendall effect.

Life and works
He was raised in Highland Park, Michigan and received his bachelor's from Wayne State University. His master's and PhD came from the University of Michigan, but he returned to Wayne to teach chemical engineering. In 1984 he was inducted into the College of Engineering's Hall of Fame. He died in a nursing home in Alexandria, Virginia.

References

Further reading

American metallurgists
Wayne State University alumni
University of Michigan alumni
Wayne State University faculty
1914 births
2005 deaths
People from Charlevoix County, Michigan
People from Highland Park, Michigan